Naval (IPA: [nɐ'val]), officially the Municipality of Naval, is a 2nd class municipality and capital of the province of Biliran, Philippines. According to the 2020 census, it has a population of 58,187 people.

History

The town of Naval was once named Bagazumbol, which was perceived by natives as being too warlike a description. The aboriginal name was later modified in 1859 to a more peaceful name—the presently known Naval.

On May 26, 1860, Naval was separated from Biliran, but it became an independent parish only in September later that year. The following year, on July 31, 1861, Romualdo Ximeno, Bishop of Cebu, officially declared Naval an independent parish. In August 1861, Father Santos de Santa Juana took up formal residence as the first parish priest of Naval and served the town for twenty-one years until 1882.

On September 26, 1869, Naval was officially established and recognized as an independent pueblo.

In 1957, the barrio of Higatangan was abolished, and its sitios of Libertad and Mabini were converted into barrios.

Cityhood

As of today, Naval pushes itself on its way to cityhood.

House Bill No. 6230 was filed last February 10, 2020 for the conversion of the municipality of Naval into a component city in the province of Biliran. The bill is currently pending with the committee on local government since February 12, 2020.

Geography
Higatangan Island is under jurisdiction of Naval Municipality.

According to the Philippine Statistics Authority, the municipality has a land area of  constituting  of the  total area of Biliran, making it the largest municipality in the province.

Barangays
Naval is politically subdivided into 26 barangays. Barangays Libertad and Mabini are located in Higatangan Island.

Climate

Demographics

In the 2020 census, Naval had a population of 58,187.

Economy

Government
The mayors of Naval were Absalon Sablada who served from 1952 to 1955; Brigido Caneja, Sr. from 1956 to 1971; Arturo Velasquez from 1972 to 1979; Niceto Limpiado from 1980 to 1986; Fortunato Casas from 1986 to 1987; Gorgonio Contredas and Francisca Bangcuyo in 1987; and Simeon Pitao from 1988 to 1997. Gerardo J. Espina, Jr. from 1998 to 2004, and Gerardo S. Espina, Sr. from 2004 to 2006. Presently, the town is headed by Gerard Roger Espina.

Transportation 
 By land: Buses and vans travel to Tacloban (in Leyte); jeepneys go to other towns in Biliran; tricycles or habal-habals are the mode of transport within Naval.
By air: The town is served by Biliran Airport (ICAO: RPVQ).
 By sea: Pump boats can be taken or chartered for going to Leyte, Higatangan Island, Naval and Mariripi.

Education
The main campus of Biliran Province State University (BiPSU) is located in Naval.

 Public secondary schools
 Biliran Province State University-Laboratory High School (BiPSU-LHS)
 Naval School of Fisheries (NSF)
 Naval National High School (NNHS)
 Lucsoon National High School (LNHS)
 Higatangan National High School (HNHS)

 Private secondary schools
 Cathedral School of La Naval (CSN)
 Limpiado Memorial Foundation, Inc. (Lightbringer Learning Center)

 Public elementary schools

 Naval Central School (Naval North District)
 Naval SpEd (Special Education) Center
 Caraycaray Central School (Naval South District)
 Agpangi Elementary School
 Anislagan Elementary School
 Atipolo Elementary School
 Borac Elementary School
 Cabungaan Elementary School
 Calumpang Elementary School
 Capinahan Elementary School
 Catmon Elementary School
 Haguikhikan Elementary School
 Higatangan Elementary School
 Imelda Elementary School
 Larazabal Elementary School
 Libtong Elementary School
 Lico Elementary School
 Lucsoon Elementary School
 P.S. Eamiguel Elementary School
 San Pablo Elementary School
 Sabang Elementary School
 Talustusan Elementary School
 Villa Caneja Elementary School
 Villa Consuelo Elementary School

 Private elementary schools
 Cathedral School of La Naval
 Limpiado Memorial Foundation, Inc. (Lightbringer Learning Center)

Healthcare
Naval has the following health facilities:
 Naval Municipal Health Center
 Biliran Provincial Hospital
 Naval Doctors' Healthcare Services
 FCE Polyclinic and Diagnostic
 Mother and Child Clinic

References

External links
 
 
 [ Philippine Standard Geographic Code]

Municipalities of Biliran
Provincial capitals of the Philippines